Klaus Kern  (born 24 March 1960) is a German physical chemist. Kern received the Gottfried Wilhelm Leibniz Prize of the Deutsche Forschungsgemeinschaft in 2008.

Biography 
Kern studied at the University of Bonn chemistry and physics, and received his Ph.D. in 1986.

Research 

He worked first at the Jülich Research Centre (1986-1991) and at Bell Labs as visiting research fellow in 1988. 

He became professor at the École Polytechnique Fédérale de Lausanne in 1991. 

Since 1998, he is one of the directors of the Max Planck Institute for Solid State Research in Stuttgart.

Through his research and publications, Kern has pioneered the bottom-up fabrication and characterization of nanostructures all the way down to molecular and atomic length scales. 

He and his group have developed novel methods to control atomic and molecular interactions at surfaces which have provided the unique ability to engineer atomic and molecular architectures of well-defined size, shape, composition and functionality.

In 2008, he received the Gottfried Wilhelm Leibniz Prize of the Deutsche Forschungsgemeinschaft, which is the highest honour awarded in German research. , his h-index is 124 according to Google Scholar.

References

External links
Webpage of Klaus Kern (MPI Stuttgart)
Entry of Klaus Kern on Webpage of Max Planck Society

1960 births
Living people
21st-century German chemists
21st-century German physicists
Gottfried Wilhelm Leibniz Prize winners
University of Bonn alumni
Max Planck Institute directors